People's war (Chinese: 人民战争), also called protracted people's war, is a Maoist military strategy. First developed by the Chinese communist revolutionary leader Mao Zedong (1893–1976), the basic concept behind people's war is to maintain the support of the population and draw the enemy deep into the countryside (stretching their supply lines) where the population will bleed them dry through a mix of mobile warfare and guerrilla warfare. It was used by the Chinese communists against the Imperial Japanese Army in World War II, and by the Chinese Soviet Republic in the Chinese Civil War.

The term is used by Maoists for their strategy of long-term armed revolutionary struggle. After the Sino-Vietnamese War in 1979, Deng Xiaoping abandoned people's war for "People's War under Modern Conditions", which moved away from reliance on troops over technology. With the adoption of "socialism with Chinese characteristics", economic reforms fueled military and technological investment. Troop numbers were also reduced and professionalisation encouraged.

The strategy of people's war was used heavily by the Viet Cong in the Vietnam War. However, protracted war should not be confused with the "foco" theory employed by Che Guevara and Fidel Castro in the Cuban Revolution of 1959.

Overview

In China

In its original formulation by Chairman Mao Zedong, people's war exploits the few advantages that a small revolutionary movement has—broad-based popular support can be one of them—against a state's power with a large, professional, well-equipped and well-funded army. People's war strategically avoids decisive battles, since a tiny force of a few dozen soldiers would easily be routed in an all-out confrontation with the state. Instead, it favours a three-phase strategy of protracted warfare, with carefully chosen battles that can realistically be won.

In phase one, the revolutionary force conducting people's war starts in a remote area with mountainous or forested terrain in which its enemy is weak. It attempts to establish a local stronghold known as a revolutionary base area. As it grows in power, it enters phase two, establishes other revolutionary base areas and spreads its influence through the surrounding countryside, where it may become the governing power and gain popular support through such programmes as land reform. Eventually in phase three, the movement has enough strength to encircle and capture small cities, then larger ones, until finally it seizes power in the entire country.

Within the Chinese Red Army, the concept of people's war was the basis of strategy against the Japanese, and against a hypothetical Soviet invasion of China. The concept of people's war became less important with the collapse of the Soviet Union and the increasing possibility of conflict with the United States over Taiwan. In the 1980s and 1990s the concept of people's war was changed to include more high-technology weaponry.

Historian David Priestland dates the beginning of the policy of people's war to the publication of a "General Outline for Military Work" in May 1928, by Chinese Central Committee.  This document established official military strategies to the Chinese Red Army during the Chinese civil war.

The strategy of people's war has political dimensions in addition to its military dimensions. In China, the early People's Liberation Army was composed of peasants who had previously lacked political significance and control over their place in the social order. Its internal organization was egalitarian between soldiers and officers, and its external relationship with rural civilians was egalitarian. As sociologist Alessandro Russo summarizes, the political existence of peasants via the PLA was a radical exception to the rules of Chinese society and "overturned the strict traditional hierarchies in unprecedented forms of egalitarianism[.]"

Other usage in Chinese rhetoric 
In 2014 Party leadership in Xinjiang commenced a People's War against the “Three Evil Forces” of separatism, terrorism, and extremism. They deployed two hundred thousand party cadres to Xinjiang and the launched the Civil Servant-Family Pair Up program. Xi was dissatisfied with the initial results of the People's War and replaced Zhang Chunxian with Chen Quanguo in 2016. Following his appointment Chen oversaw the recruitment of tens of thousands of additional police officers and the division of society into three categories: trusted, average, untrustworthy. He instructed his subordinated to “Take this crackdown as the top project,” and “to preempt the enemy, to strike at the outset.” Following a meeting with Xi in Beijing Chen Quanguo held a rally in Ürümqi with ten thousand troops, helicopters, and armored vehicles. As they paraded he announced a “smashing, obliterating offensive,” and declared that they would “bury the corpses of terrorists and terror gangs in the vast sea of the People’s War.”

In February 2020, the Chinese Communist Party launched an aggressive campaign described by the Party general secretary Xi Jinping as a "people's war" to contain the spread of the coronavirus.

Outside China
Outside China, the people's war doctrine has been successful in Cuba, Nepal, Vietnam, and Nicaragua, but generally unsuccessful elsewhere in which the government has the will and the means to break up the movement before it can establish base areas.

Outside China, people's war has been basis of wars started in Peru on May 2, 1982, and in the Nepalese Civil War begun on February 9, 1999. A group of Peruvian Maoists known as the Shining Path at times controlled most of the country during the internal conflict in Peru, but they were dealt a blow by the arrest of their leader Abimael Guzmán in 1992. While they claim to consider this event only a "bend in the road", most independent sources have claimed them to be in decline since that time.

According to most sources, at the height of the conflict in Peru, both the Shining Path and the Peruvian government used terror tactics against the civilian population, especially in the countryside. Government tactics included sponsorship of death squads; Shining Path tactics included violent attacks on trade unionists and others they saw as rivals for the leadership of those opposing the government. This atmosphere of fear has made it very difficult to get any objective measure of support among the peasantry for either the government or the Maoist insurgents.

In Nepal, the Maoists succeeded in controlling most of the country and formed 100,000 troops into 3 divisions in what they called the "beginning of the strategic offensive". Some of these troops were conscripted. By aligning with the democracy movement, with the subsequent restoration of democracy, and a peace agreement with the government, the Maoist insurgency was able to form a coalition government in 2008.

In India, the Naxalite Maoist insurgency controls several rural districts in the eastern and southern regions, especially in Andhra Pradesh, Chhattisgarh and Jharkhand. In the Philippines the Communist Party of the Philippines is waging an enduring people's war through its armed wing, the New People's Army, the Turkish TKP/ML and its armed wing TiKKO (Turkish Workers and Peasants Liberation Army) has been waging a People's War in Turkey since 1972.

During the 1980s in Ireland, IRA leader Jim Lynagh devised a Maoist urban guerilla military strategy adapted to Irish conditions aimed at escalating the war against British security forces. The plan envisaged the destruction of police stations and military barracks in parts of Northern Ireland in order to create areas under complete IRA control. In 1984 he started cooperating with Pádraig McKearney who shared his views. The strategy began materializing with the destruction of two Royal Ulster Constabulary (RUC) stations in Ballygawley in December 1985 (resulting in the death of two RUC officers), and in The Birches in August 1986. Lynagh and his IRA unit were killed in another attack on a RUC police station in Loughgall in an SAS ambush.

In non-communist states such as Iran, the Islamic Revolutionary Guard Corps used the protracted people's war against Iraq. It is also applied to the Houthi movement in Yemen, an armed faction supported by Iran.

List of people's wars
Conflicts in the following list are labelled as people's wars by Maoists.

In some other countries, maoists tried or still are trying to start and develop the People's War:
Purba Banglar Sarbahara Party participated in the Bangladesh Liberation War and is still involved in armed struggle against the Bangladeshi government.
Between 1967 and 1974 militants of the Communist Party of Brazil led guerilla in Araguaia river basin against the military dictatorship.
In 1982 in Iran the Union of Iranian Communists launched an armed campaign in Amol County.
Maoist organizations in Afghanistan – SAMA and ALO – participated in Soviet–Afghan War.
Armed organization DFLP declared that Palestinian national goals could be achieved only through revolution of the masses and People's War.
In 1973 Spanish Maoist group GRAPO started an armed campaign against the Francoist regime which continued until 1996, over twenty years after Franco's death.
Communist Party of Bhutan (Marxist–Leninist–Maoist) and its armed wing Bhutan Tiger Force are trying to start a People's War in Bhutan.

See also
On Protracted War
 Soviet partisans
 Viet Cong and PAVN strategy, organization and structure
 Strategy and tactics of guerrilla warfare
 Colombian conflict (1964–present)
 Paraguayan People's Army insurgency

References

Citations

Sources 

 VK Shashikumar. Red Terror: India under siege from within, CNN-IBN, March 16, 2006.

External links
Mao Zedong: On Protracted War
Communist Party of Peru: Military line 
Communist Party of the Philippines: Specific Characteristics of our People's War
Communist Party of India: Strategy & Tactics of the Indian Revolution

Cold War history of China
Guerrilla warfare
Ideology of the Chinese Communist Party
Maoism
Maoist terminology
Military history of the People's Republic of China
Military strategy
Revolution terminology
Wars by type